The 2010 Dunlop World Challenge was a professional tennis tournament played on indoor carpet courts. It was the third edition of the tournament which was part of the 2010 ATP Challenger Tour and 2010 ITF Women's Circuit. It took place in Toyota, Japan between 22 and 28 November 2010.

ATP entrants

Seeds

 Rankings are as of November 15, 2010.

Other entrants
The following players received wildcards into the singles main draw:
  Hiroyasu Ehara
  Junn Mitsuhashi
  Takuto Niki
  Arata Onozawa

The following players received entry from the qualifying draw:
  Tasuku Iwami
  Toshihide Matsui
  Kento Takeuchi (LL)
  Yasutaka Uchiyama
  Wang Yeu-tzuoo

WTA entrants

Seeds

 Rankings are as of November 15, 2010.

Other entrants
The following players received wildcards into the singles main draw:
  Sachie Ishizu
  Ksenia Lykina
  Aiko Nakamura
  Akiko Omae

The following players received entry from the qualifying draw:
  Shuko Aoyama
  Miyabi Inoue
  Kim Kun-hee (LL)
  Kotomi Takahata
  Erika Takao

Champions

Men's singles

 Tatsuma Ito def.  Yūichi Sugita, 6–4, 6–2

Women's singles

 Misaki Doi def.  Junri Namigata, 7–5, 6–2

Men's doubles

 Treat Conrad Huey /  Purav Raja def.  Tasuku Iwami /  Hiroki Kondo, 6–1, 6–2

Women's doubles

 Shuko Aoyama /  Rika Fujiwara def.  Irina-Camelia Begu /  Mădălina Gojnea, 1–6, 6–3, [11–9]

External links
Official website (Japanese)
ITF search 

 
Dunlop World Challenge
Dunlop World Challenge
Dunlop World Challenge
Dunlop World Challenge
Dunlop World Challenge